Unicom may refer to:

 UNICOM, or Universal Communications, air-ground communication facility
 Unicom Corp, a defunct energy holding company in the United States
 China Unicom, telecommunication operator in China
 UNICOM Global, US-based IT company